Fintona Pearses is a Gaelic Athletic Association club based in Fintona, County Tyrone, Northern Ireland. It is a member of the Tyrone GAA county board and is named after the Irish poet and revolutionary, Patrick Pearse.

The club primarily concentrates on Gaelic football for both men & women, with boys hurling teams fielded at youth level. Its home venue is called St Lawrence's Park, located just outside the village on the Tattymoyle Road.

As of 2023, the senior Gaelic football team competes in Division 3 of the Tyrone All-County Football League as well as the Tyrone Junior Football Championship.

History
Fintona Pearses was founded in September 1916 and despite some stop-starts in the 1920s, the club has been continuously active since 1932. At the time of founding there was already a club in the village, Fintona Davitts, which had been in existence since 1907 and the two sides met each other in competition twice in 1917. The Davitts club however went out of existence shortly afterwards.
The club won the Tyrone Senior Football Championship in 1938, defeating Cookstown in the final. The last appearance in the final was in 1979 when they lost out to Carrickmore.

A Tyrone Intermediate Football Championship title was claimed in 1978 defeating Killyclogher in the final and the Tyrone Junior Football Championship title in 1975 after beating Gortin in the decider.

The club has the distinction of being the only one in Tyrone to have won the Senior, Intermediate, Junior, and all three Reserve Football Championships in its existence.

Ladies Football
A separate Ladies Gaelic Football club of the same name was founded in 1996 that first competed in Tyrone competitions in 1997. In 2022 a membership vote consisting separately of the GAA & LGFA clubs both approved a merger of the two clubs into becoming one club under the Fintona Pearses GAA Club banner.

Camogie
Fintona was also home to the first camogie club in Tyrone, called Fintona Rose Kavanaghs which was founded around the same time as Fintona Davitts.

Honours
 Tyrone Senior Football Championship (2)
 1913/14, 1938
 Tyrone Intermediate Football Championship
 1978
 Tyrone Junior Football Championship (1)
 1975

References

External links
 Fintona Pearses GAC on Facebook
 Fintona Pearses GAC on Twitter
 Fintona Pearses GAC on Instagram

Gaelic games clubs in County Tyrone
Gaelic football clubs in County Tyrone
Hurling clubs in County Tyrone
Civil parish of Donacavey